Nong Chok is a khwaeng (subdistrict) of Nong Chok District, in Bangkok, Thailand. In 2020, it had a total population of 22,945 people.

References

Subdistricts of Bangkok